Synaptic vesicle glycoprotein 2B is a protein that in humans is encoded by the SV2B gene.

See also
 SV2A

References

Further reading